The 1901 Georgia Bulldogs football team was an American football team that represented the Georgia Bulldogs of the University of Georgia during the 1901 Southern Intercollegiate Athletic Association football season. The Bulldogs completed the season with a 1–5–2 record.  Georgia's only victory in the 1901 season came in the first game of the season against South Carolina.  The two ties came against Auburn and Alabama.  The season also included Georgia's third consecutive loss to Sewanee.  This was the Georgia Bulldogs' first season under the guidance of head coach Billy Reynolds.

The end of the 1901 season marked the end of the first decade of football at the University of Georgia.  In those ten years, the team had eight different coaches and a combined record of 26–23–4, a winning percentage of .528.

Schedule

References

Georgia
Georgia Bulldogs football seasons
Georgia Bulldogs football